Josef Benedikt Kuriger (1754–1815) was a sculptor and model maker from Einsiedeln, Schwyz, who pioneered embryological modeling. Kuriger's work at the anatomical theatre in Paris gave him the experience to move from portraits and devotional objects into anatomy and obstetrics. Kuriger created wax models of embryos, based on Samuel Thomas von Soemmerring's .

Quellen

Literature 
Adrian Christoph Suter: Die anatomischen Reliefdarstellungen des Einsiedler Kleinkünstlers J. B. Kuriger, unpublished dissertation at the Medizinhistorisches Institut der Universitat Bern, 1986.

External links 
Picture of a clay plate, based on Kuriger's wax models

1754 births
1815 deaths
Model makers
Swiss sculptors